Bowling Green Township is a township in Chariton County, in the U.S. state of Missouri.

Bowling Green Township was established in 1840, and most likely was named after Bowling Green, Kentucky.

References

Townships in Missouri
Townships in Chariton County, Missouri